Coronary may, as shorthand in English, be used to mean:

 Coronary circulation, the system of arteries and veins in mammals
 Coronary artery disease
Coronary occlusion
 A myocardial infarction, a heart attack

As adjective
 Referring to the work of a Coroner, a person entitled to investigate deaths
 Referring to a stellar corona, the outermost atmosphere of a star
 Mistakenly to a Cornea, part of a mammalian eye.